Stigmella polydoxa is a moth of the family Nepticulidae. It is indigenous to Peradeniya, Sri Lanka.

It is characterised by its small size of 3mm and a silvery tornal patch in cilia.

References

Nepticulidae
Moths described in 1911
Endemic fauna of Sri Lanka
Moths of Asia